Two Days and Two Nights of New Music or 2D2N is an annual 48-hour music festival held in Odessa, Ukraine. The festival features new music from both Ukrainian and international artists, mostly in the experimental music genre. Founded by Karmella Tsepkolenko in 1995, it is organized by the Association for New Music, the Ukrainian section of the International Society for Contemporary Music. The current president of the festival is German composer and conductor Bernhard Wulff. Having grown steadily since its inception, 2D2N is considered one of the largest music festivals in Ukraine. It is funded through government support, private donors, and various of international government agencies and projects, including those of Israel, Sweden, and Switzerland.

See also 
Kontrasty
Premieres of the Season (Musical Festival)

References

Annual events in Ukraine
Music festivals in Ukraine
Music festivals established in 1995
Spring (season) events in Ukraine